In mathematics, an addition chain for computing a positive integer  can be given by a sequence of natural numbers starting with 1 and ending with , such that each number in the sequence is the sum of two previous numbers. The length of an addition chain is the number of sums needed to express all its numbers, which is one less than the cardinality of the sequence of numbers.

Examples
As an example: (1,2,3,6,12,24,30,31) is an addition chain for 31 of length 7, since
2 = 1 + 1
3 = 2 + 1
6 = 3 + 3
12 = 6 + 6
24 = 12 + 12
30 = 24 + 6
31 = 30 + 1

Addition chains can be used for addition-chain exponentiation. This method allows exponentiation with integer exponents to be performed using a number of multiplications equal to the length of an addition chain for the exponent. For instance, the addition chain for 31 leads to a method for computing the 31st power of any number  using only seven multiplications, instead of the 30 multiplications that one would get from repeated multiplication, and eight multiplications with exponentiation by squaring:
2 =  × 
3 = 2 × 
6 = 3 × 3
12 = 6 × 6
24 = 12 × 12
30 = 24 × 6
31 = 30 ×

Methods for computing addition chains
Calculating an addition chain of minimal length is not easy; a generalized version of the problem, in which one must find a chain that simultaneously forms each of a sequence of values, is NP-complete. There is no known algorithm which can calculate a minimal addition chain for a given number with any guarantees of reasonable timing or small memory usage. However, several techniques are known to calculate relatively short chains that are not always optimal.

One very well known technique to calculate relatively short addition chains is the binary method, similar to exponentiation by squaring. If  is odd, this method uses two sums to obtain it, by computing  and then adding one.

The factor method for finding addition chains is based on the prime factorization of the number  to be represented. Additional refinements of these ideas lead to a family of methods called sliding window methods.

Chain length
Let  denote the smallest  so that there exists an addition chain
of length  which computes .
It is known that
,

However, this is not always an equality,
as in some cases  may have a shorter chain than the one obtained in this way. For instance, observed by Knuth.

Brauer chain
A Brauer chain or star addition chain is an addition chain in which each of the sums used to calculate its numbers uses the immediately previous number. A Brauer number is a number for which a Brauer chain is optimal.

Brauer proved that

where  is the length of the shortest star chain. The smallest such n is 12509.

Scholz conjecture

The Scholz conjecture (sometimes called the Scholz–Brauer or Brauer–Scholz conjecture), named after Arnold Scholz and Alfred T. Brauer), is a conjecture from 1937 stating that

This inequality is known to hold for all Hansen numbers, a generalization of Brauer numbers; Neill Clift checked by computer that all  are Hansen (while 5784689 is not).  Clift further verified that in fact  for all .

See also
 Addition-subtraction chain
 Vectorial addition chain
 Lucas chain

References

   Section C6.

External links
 http://wwwhomes.uni-bielefeld.de/achim/addition_chain.html
 . Note that the initial "1" is not counted (so element #1 in the sequence is 0).
F. Bergeron, J. Berstel. S. Brlek "Efficient computation of addition chains"